The night aulonocara (Aulonocara hueseri) is a species of freshwater fish in the family Cichlidae. It is endemic to Lake Malawi and known from the Malawian part of the lake. It grows to  SL. The specific name honours the cichlid aquarist  Eberhard Hüser of Hildesheim in Germany.

References

Night aulonocara
Endemic fauna of Malawi
Fish of Malawi
Fish of Lake Malawi
Taxa named by Manfred K. Meyer
Taxa named by Rüdiger Riehl
Taxa named by Horst Zetzsche
Fish described in 1987
Taxonomy articles created by Polbot